The Boys' Brigade, Hong Kong (  Short-form: BBHK) is a branch of the Boys' Brigade. It is a uniformed  youth organisation (香港青少年制服團體) founded in 1959, currently with more than 200 companies.

Structure
BBHK is divided into four sections:
Anchor Lambs: ages 3–5
Pre-junior section: ages 5–8
Junior section: ages 8–11
Company section: ages 11–18
Senior section: ages 16–21

List of Some Companies

8th Company
One of the oldest companies in Hong Kong, The 8th Company of the Boys' Brigade, Hong Kong (香港基督少年軍第八分隊), BB8 for short, is still actively involved in the programme. Founded in 1969, members and officers meet weekly (Saturday 2.15pm-5.30pm) at CCC Kei Chun Church, situated in Kei Chun Primary School, Mei Foo. It currently has members in all sections, the age ranges from 5 to 20. Company members, in particular, are greatly encouraged to join church services on Sunday, too, so as to promote further spiritual growth.

37th Company
The 37th Company of the Boys' Brigade, Hong Kong(香港基督少年軍第三十七分隊), BB37 for short, is stationed in Choi Yuen Estate, Sheung Shui. It is one of the first companies to allow girls to partake in the Boys' Brigade, and is founded in 1980.

38th Company
The 38th Company of the Boys' Brigade, Hong Kong (香港基督少年軍第三十八分隊), BB38 for short, is a  division founded in 1985, stationed in Sha Tin Methodist College, and is currently supported by Sha Tin Methodist Church. Members' ages range from 7–18, with both girls and boys participating. Weekly activities include foot drill, Christian education and badge courses.

50th Company 
HKBB50 was a company founded in 1991 by the Hong Kong Baptist Church. The company was formed by 2 major sections: the Company section and the Junior section. With more than 80 members, the company has a team of officers and NCOs to take command. This company develops participant's discipline, Christian education and technical skills.

80th Company
The 80th Company of the Boy's Brigade, Hong Kong (香港基督少年軍第八十分隊), BB80 for short, is founded in September 2001. Stationed at Shatin Baptist Church, it is currently the company with the most members in Hong Kong, and has two meeting days, one on Saturday and one on Sunday. Pre-Juniors and Juniors can choose between Saturday or Sunday to go to, while the Company section must attend the meetings at Saturday. It is mandatory that they join church services on Saturday/Sunday, or they are denied any badges.

133rd Company
The 133rd Company of the Boys' Brigade, Hong Kong （香港基督少年軍第133分隊）or BB133 for short was formed in May, 2003. It is running by Shau Kei Wan Alliance Church（基督教宣道會筲箕灣堂）, 19/F Seaview Plaza, 283 Shau Kei Wan Road, Shau Kei Wan, Hong Kong Island. The company are running Junior and Company sections while was also running Senior section in the past. The meeting time is 3:00pm, Saturday. The founder of the company is Tam Wan Chung, Steven.

135th Company
The 135th Company of the Boys' Brigade, Hong Kong (香港基督少年軍第135分隊) or BB135 for short was formed in 2003.  It is supported by Yew Chung International School, Hong Kong, Somerset Road 20–22, Kowloon Tong, Kowloon.  Its members take part in marching, Christian education, badge courses, etc.

204th Company
The 204th Company of Boys' Brigade, Hong Kong (香港基督少年軍第204分隊) or BB204, was founded in 2005.  BB204 is supported by Christian Pun Shek Church.

227th Company
The 227th Company of Boys' Brigade, Hong Kong (香港基督少年軍第227分隊) or BB227, was founded in 2006.    BB227 is supported by Cumberland Presbyterian Church Yao Dao Secondary School(金巴崙長老會耀道中學), base on 28 Hong Yip Street, Yuen Long, Yuen Long Kau Hui, Hong Kong Yuen Long, Focus on Christian Education, foot drills, badge course etc., This Company only have Company Section. the company has a team of officers and NCOs to take command. This company develops participant's discipline, Christian education and technical skills.

268th Company
The 268th Company of Boys' Brigade, Hong Kong (香港基督少年軍第268分隊) or BB268, was founded on March 28, 2009.  BB268 is supported by Tsung Tsin Mission of Hong Kong Shau Ki Wan Church(基督教香港崇真會筲箕灣堂), 4 Basel Road, Shau Kei Wan, Hong Kong.

References

External links
Official BBHK Website (in Chinese)
 The 38th Company of the Boys' Brigade, Hong Kong

Youth organisations based in Hong Kong
Protestant churches in Hong Kong
Boys' Brigade
1959 establishments in Hong Kong
Youth organizations established in 1959